Mecopus is a genus of true weevil in the subfamily Baridinae.

List of species 
 Mecopus albomaculatus Chevrolat
 Mecopus albosparsus Chevrolat
 Mecopus ambonensis Heller, 1892  
 Mecopus annulipes Hombron & Jacquinot, 1847  
 Mecopus audinetii Rosenschoeld, 1838  
 Mecopus bispinosus Weber, 1801
 Mecopus brevipennis Hombron & Jacquinot, 1847  
 Mecopus caffer Fåhraeus, 1871  
 Mecopus caledonicus Heller, 1892  
 Mecopus ceylanensis Heller, 1892  
 Mecopus cuneiformis Pascoe, 1871  
 Mecopus curtus Chevrolat,  
 Mecopus doryphorus Quoy, 1824  
 Mecopus evolans Wiedemann, 1823  
 Mecopus fausti Heller, 1892  
 Mecopus hopei Rosenschoeld, 1838  
 Mecopus longipes Chevrolat,  
 Mecopus ludovici Heller, 1892  
 Mecopus moluccarum Kirsch, 1886  
 Mecopus nidulans Benn.  
 Mecopus nigroplagiatus Heller, 1921  
 Mecopus phthisicus Lea, 1898  
 Mecopus serrirostris Pascoe, 1871  
 Mecopus sphaerops Schoenherr, 1838  
 Mecopus talanthoides Heller, 1892  
 Mecopus terraereginae Heller, 1892  
 Mecopus tipularis Pascoe, 1870  
 Mecopus trilineatus Guérin-Méneville, 1833  
 Mecopus vulneratus Wiedeman, 1823

References 

 Electronic Catalogue of Weevil names (Curculionoidea) 
 Universal Biological Indexer
 Anic.ento

Baridinae genera